Pippa is a female given name and a hypocorism, usually of Philippa. People with the name Pippa include:
 Pippa Black (b. 1982), Australian actress
 Pippa Bunce, British banking executive
 Pippa Duncan, British Royal Navy officer
 Pippa Funnell (b. 1968), British equestrienne
 Pippa Guard (b. 1952), British actress
 Pippa Haywood (b. 1961), English actress
 Pippa Mann (b. 1983), British race car driver
 Pippa Middleton (b. 1983), English socialite, sister of the Princess of Wales
 Pippa Scott (b. 1935), American actress
 Pippa Steel (1948–1992), British actress
 Pippa Wicks, British businesswoman
 Rosalba Pippa, a musical performer

The name may have been popularised by Robert Browning's poem Pippa Passes.

See also
 Philippa

References

English given names
Feminine given names
Given names